Central Corfu and Diapontian Islands ( Kentriki Kerkyra kai Diapontia Nisia) is a municipality in the Ionian Islands region in Greece. It covers the central part of the island of Corfu and the Diapontian Islands. The municipality was formed at the 2019 local government reform, when the pre-existing municipality of Corfu was divided in three. Its seat is the city Corfu.

The municipality consists of the following eight subdivisions (municipal units):
Achilleio
Corfu (city)
Ereikoussa
Faiakes
Mathraki
Othonoi
Palaiokastritsa
Parelioi

References 

Populated places in Corfu (regional unit)
2019 establishments in Greece
Municipalities of the Ionian Islands (region)